Weatherly or Weatherley may refer to:

Weatherly
Weatherly, Pennsylvania, a borough in Carbon County, Pennsylvania, USA
Weatherly Area School District, a public school district in Carbon County, Pennsylvania, USA
Weatherly, in sailing, (of a boat), able to sail close to the wind without drifting leeward
Weatherly Building, a 12-story office building in Portland, Oregon built in 1926 by George Warren Weatherly
Weatherly (yacht), designed by Philip Rhodes, which successfully defended the America's Cup in 1962.
Weatherly 201, Weatherly 620, American agricultural monoplanes (since 1960) designed and built by John Weatherly and the Weatherly Aviation Company

Weatherly as a surname
 Amelia Heinle (also used married name: "Amelia Weatherly") (born 1973), American actress known for daytime soap operas
 Andrew Earl Weatherly (1895–1981), a philatelist of North Carolina,
 Bones Weatherly (1928–2004), American football player
 Clay Weatherly (1910–1935) American racecar driver
 Frederick Weatherly (1848–1929), English lawyer, author, songwriter and radio entertainer
 Jim Weatherly (1943–2021), American singer-songwriter
 Joe Weatherly (1922–1964), American NASCAR championship driver
 L.A. Weatherly or Lee Weatherly (born 1967), American author
 Mark Weatherly (born 1958), English retired football (soccer) player
 Michael Weatherly (born 1968), American actor
 Richard Weatherly (born 1947), Australian artist
 Roy Weatherly (1915–1991) an American professional baseball player
 Shawn Weatherly (born 1959), American beauty queen and entertainer
 Stephen Weatherly (born 1994), American football player

Weatherley
 David Weatherley (born 1939), British actor
 Joe Weatherley English cricketer
 Laurence Weatherley, British-American engineer
 Mike Weatherley (1957–2021), British Conservative politician and Member of Parliament for Hove, elected in the 2010 general election
 Steve Weatherley (born 1957), English former motorcycle speedway rider

See also
 Weston under Wetherley